Juan Diego Madrigal Espinoza (born 21 May 1987) is a Costa Rican footballer who plays for Santos Guápiles as a defender.

Club career
Madrigal started his career with Municipal Liberia making first team debut with the club in 2010. After playing just one match he was transferred to Barrio México. He made 21 appearances for the side, before joining Santos Guápiles in 2011.

In 2013, he joined Norwegian club Fredrikstad on a year loan. However the contract was soon terminated because of the financial difficulties faced by them. Then he returned to Costa Rica by signing for Deportivo Saprissa.

International career
On 10 July 2014, he made his international debut against Cuba in 2013 CONCACAF Gold Cup.

Honours

Individual
CONCACAF League Team of the Tournament: 2017

References

External links
 

1986 births
Living people
Association football defenders
Costa Rican footballers
Costa Rica international footballers
Municipal Liberia footballers
Santos de Guápiles footballers
Deportivo Saprissa players
Liga FPD players
Norwegian First Division players
C.S. Cartaginés players
Fredrikstad FK players
Costa Rican expatriate footballers
Expatriate footballers in Mexico
Costa Rican expatriate sportspeople in Mexico
Expatriate footballers in Norway
Costa Rican expatriate sportspeople in Norway
2013 Copa Centroamericana players
2013 CONCACAF Gold Cup players
2014 Copa Centroamericana players
Copa Centroamericana-winning players